William J. Quirk (born September 1, 1946) is an American politician who served in the California State Assembly from 2012 to 2022. A member of the Democratic Party, Quirk represented the 20th Assembly district, which encompasses the southern East Bay of the San Francisco Bay Area.

Prior to being elected to the Assembly in 2012, he was a nuclear physicist and served on the Hayward City Council.

Education
After earning his Ph.D. in astrophysics from Columbia University at the age of 24, Quirk became a postdoctoral fellow at the California Institute of Technology in Pasadena, where he published papers on galactic structure.

Career

Physicist
Upon returning to New York City, Quirk joined NASA as a research scientist and developed the Goddard Institute for Space Studies climate model, which he used for some of the first studies of climate change. Quirk left NASA to work at the management consulting firm McKinsey and Company in New York City in their computer system practice. Quirk then worked in the computer industry in Silicon Valley before settling into a career at the Lawrence Livermore National Laboratory (LLNL), where he established himself in the fields of atmospheric science and nuclear technology design. Quirk became this country's expert in nuclear programs in numerous foreign countries. Quirk prepared reports for the Presidential Daily Brief and played a key role in the negotiations for the Nuclear Test Ban Treaty.  Teaching physics at Columbia University, Caltech and UC Davis helped Quirk formulate his lifelong interest in education.

Quirk was a physicist at LLNL for 26 years (1979-2005). In 1996, he helped break the deadlock in the negotiations of the Comprehensive Nuclear-Test-Ban Treaty. In the early 1990s, he also showed that the plutonium parts of nuclear weapons could be reused. This resulted in the closing of the Rocky Flats plutonium fabrication facility near Denver, Colorado. This removed the threat of a major environment disaster in the Denver metropolitan area. There had already been a major fire at the facility that had threatened to spread plutonium oxide across the metropolitan area.

Politics

City Council
Quirk served from 2004-12 on the Hayward City Council. While on the Council, Quirk served on the Board of Bay Area Water Supply and Conservation Agency, and the Hayward Area Shoreline Planning Agency. While on the city council, Quirk was dedicated to revitalizing Hayward through promoting jobs and safe and clean neighborhoods.

Quirk also served on the city's Hayward-Ghazni Sister City Committee, promoting relations between the city and the province of Ghazni, Afghanistan, while on the Council.

California State Assembly
Quirk is the only rocket engineer to serve in the California legislature. He has a Ph.D. in astrophysics from Columbia University (1970).

Since being elected to the California State Assembly in November 2012, Quirk has served on five committees: Rules, which determines what committees bills are sent to; Appropriations, which determines whether bills that appropriate funds can proceed to a vote of the full assembly; Utilities and Commerce, that deals with the state's telecommunication, electric, gas, and water utilities; Agriculture; and Public Safety.

In 2014, Quirk authored a bill that made it easier to get domestic violence restraining orders in California. The bill AB2089 went into effect January 1, 2015.

In 2016, Quirk authored Assembly Bill 2130 titled "An act to amend Section 281 of the Public Utilities Code, relating to telecommunications," 
which would freeze the California Advanced Services Fund broadband infrastructure subsidy program and replace it with what amounts to a $100 million no-strings gift from the taxpayers to (mostly) AT&T, according to Steve Blum of Tellus Venture Associates.  In September 2016, the California State University East Bay Educational Foundation of Quick's district was selected as one of 18 recipients nationwide that shared in $10 million from AT&T through the Aspire Connect to Success Competition. Hundreds of organizations applied to the competition, which is part of Aspire, AT&T's philanthropic initiative.

In 2017, Quirk was principal coauthor of the controversial California Senate SB 649 which would remove a city's ability to control where 5G technology is placed and transfer that power to the state.

In 2018, Quirk was the sponsor of a bill to allow PG&E to defray the cost of settlements related to their negligence in the October 2017 Northern California Wildfires by forcing ratepayers to pay. The measure proved controversial, with noted legal researcher Erin Brockovich stating “It’s another backdoor deal for them, it’s inexcusable. I hope the state stops enabling their behavior by giving them passes time and time again.”<

On December 12, 2021, Quirk announced that he would not be a candidate for reelection. He left office on November 30, 2022, and was succeeded by labor executive Liz Ortega.

2012 California State Assembly

2014 California State Assembly

2016 California State Assembly

2018 California State Assembly

2020 California State Assembly

Personal life

Quirk and his wife Laurel moved to the Hayward area in 1978. They raised two children who attended Moreau Catholic High School and the University of California. Since moving to Hayward in 1978, Quirk served the community as president of Hayward Friends of the Library and Chair, Hayward Library Commission. He is a member of Hayward Rotary, the Hayward Arts Council and the Hayward Area Historical Society.

References

External links 
 
 Re-Elect Bill Quirk Campaign website
 Scientific Papers

Democratic Party members of the California State Assembly
1946 births
Living people
San Francisco Bay Area politicians
Columbia Graduate School of Arts and Sciences alumni
American astrophysicists
Government of Hayward, California
21st-century American politicians